The 1988 United States presidential election in Oklahoma took place on November 8, 1988. All fifty states and the District of Columbia, were part of the 1988 United States presidential election. Oklahoma voters chose eight electors to the Electoral College, which selected the president and vice president.

Oklahoma was won by incumbent United States Vice President George H. W. Bush of Texas, who was running against Massachusetts Governor Michael Dukakis. Bush ran with Indiana Senator Dan Quayle as Vice President, and Dukakis ran with Texas Senator Lloyd Bentsen.

The election was very partisan, with more than 99 percent of the electorate voting for either the Democratic or Republican parties, and only four candidates appearing on the ballot. The Southeastern portion of the state resumed turning out in large numbers for the Democratic Party; it had voted almost entirely Republican in 1984. This may be somewhat attributed to the influence of the ongoing drought and the farming crisis in the Great Plains, and of the politically volatile state of Texas, which was also changing its political orientation through the 1980s and 1990s from a Democratic area to a largely Republican one. Bush's dominance in the more populated metro Oklahoma City and Tulsa ensured a safe GOP victory. However, despite Bush and Quayle winning the state, Oklahoma swung more to the Democrats from 1984 to 1988 than any other state in the nation, swinging by 21.30%. Additionally, this remains the last time that a Democrat has won more than 60% of the vote in any Oklahoma county (these being Jefferson, Haskell, Hughes, and Coal).

Bush easily won Oklahoma on election day, defeating Dukakis by a 15-point margin. While traditionally conservative, the election results in Oklahoma were indicative of a nationwide reconsolidation of base for the Republican Party, which took place through the 1980s. Through the passage of some very controversial economic programs, spearheaded by then President Ronald Reagan (called, collectively, "Reaganomics"), the mid-to-late 1980s saw a period of economic growth and stability. The hallmark for Reaganomics was, in part, the wide-scale deregulation of corporate interests, and tax cuts for the wealthy.

Dukakis ran on a socially liberal platform and advocated for higher economic regulation and environmental protection. Bush, alternatively, ran on a campaign of continuing the social and economic policies of former President Ronald Reagan, which gained him much support with social conservatives and people living in rural areas. Additionally, while the economic programs passed under Reagan and furthered under Bush and Bill Clinton may have boosted the economy for a brief period, they are criticized by many analysts as "setting the stage" for economic troubles in the United States after 2007, such as the Great Recession.

Oklahoma weighed in for this election as 9% more Republican than the national average.

Results

Results by county

Slates of Electors
Democrat: Lou Rogers Watkins, M. David Riggs, Loretta Y. Jackson, Fred L. Boettcher, C. Pat Frank, Randy L. Beutler, Neil McElderry Jr, Demetrius Bereolos

Republican: Ron Collett, Lavelle Dennis, Mary Lou Mathis, Joyce Perring, Art Rubin, Susan Kay Schroeder, Rosemary Tarr, Dorothy Zumwalt

New Alliance: Sandra Williams, Susanne Michelle Adams, Carol J. Mizell, Toni A. Zucconi, Tania Ann Zucconi, Rhonda K. Tsotigh, Jeffrey L. Fuller, Carl Jonathan Wood

Libertarian: F. G. Litzaw, Brian W. Holk, G. Dennis Garland, Paul O. Woodward, Mary E. Laurent, Debby L. Wair, Whitney L. Boutin Jr, Michael A. Wair

See also
 United States presidential elections in Oklahoma
 Presidency of George H. W. Bush

References

Oklahoma
1988
1988 Oklahoma elections